Poręba  is a village in the administrative district of Gmina Myślenice, within Myślenice County, Lesser Poland Voivodeship, in southern Poland.

The village has a population of 1,178.

References

Villages in Myślenice County